Venetic is an extinct Indo-European language, usually classified into the Italic subgroup, that was spoken by the Veneti people in ancient times in northeast Italy (Veneto and Friuli)  and part of modern Slovenia, between the Po Delta and the southern fringe of the Alps, associated with the Este culture.

The language is attested by over 300 short inscriptions dating from the 6th to the 1st century BCE. Its speakers are identified with the ancient people called Veneti by the Romans and Enetoi by the Greeks. It became extinct around the 1st century when the local inhabitants assimilated into the Roman sphere. Inscriptions dedicating offerings to Reitia are one of the chief sources of knowledge of the Venetic language.

Linguistic classification

Venetic is a centum language. The inscriptions use a variety of the Northern Italic alphabet, similar to the Etruscan alphabet.

The exact relationship of Venetic to other Indo-European languages is still being investigated, but the majority of scholars agree that Venetic, aside from Liburnian, shared some similarities with the Italic languages and so is sometimes classified as Italic. However, since it also shared similarities with other Western Indo-European branches (particularly Celtic languages and Germanic languages), some linguists prefer to consider it an independent Indo-European language. Venetic may also have been related to the Illyrian languages once spoken in the western Balkans, though the theory that Illyrian and Venetic were closely related is debated by current scholarship.

While some scholars consider Venetic plainly an Italic language, more closely related to the Osco-Umbrian languages than to Latin, many authorities suggest, in view of the divergent verbal system, that Venetic was not part of Italic proper, but split off from the core of Italic early.

A 2012 study has suggested that Venetic was a relatively conservative language significantly similar to Celtic, on the basis of morphology, while it occupied an intermediate position between Celtic and Italic, on the basis of phonology. However these phonological similarities may have arisen as an areal phenomenon. Phonological similarities to Rhaetian have also been pointed out.

In 2016, Celtologist Peter Schrijver argued that Venetic and Italic together form one sub-branch of an Italo-Celtic branch of Indo-European, the other sub-branch being Celtic.

Fate
During the period of Latin-Venetic bilingual inscriptions in the Roman script, i.e. 150–50 BCE, Venetic became flooded with Latin loanwords. The shift from Venetic to Latin resulting in language death is thought by scholarship to have already been well under way by that time.

Features 
Venetic had about six, possibly seven, noun cases and four conjugations (similar to Latin). About 60 words are known, but some were borrowed from Latin (liber.tos. < libertus) or Etruscan. Many of them show a clear Indo-European origin, such as vhraterei < PIE *bʰréh₂trey = to the brother.

Phonology 
For Venetic, at least the developments of *bʰ and *dʰ are clearly attested. Faliscan and Osco-Umbrian have ,  and  internally as well.

There are also indications of the developments of PIE *kʷ > kv, *gʷ- > w- and PIE *gʷʰ- > f- in Venetic, the latter two being parallel to Latin; as well as the regressive assimilation of the PIE sequence *p...kʷ... > *kʷ...kʷ..., a feature also found in Italic and Celtic.

Language sample
A sample inscription in Venetic, found on a bronze nail at Este (Es 45):

Another inscription, found on a situla (vessel such as an urn or bucket) at Cadore (Ca 4 Valle):

Scholarship
The most prominent scholars who have deciphered Venetic inscriptions or otherwise contributed to the knowledge of the Venetic language are Pauli, Krahe, Pellegrini, Prosdocimi, and Lejeune. Recent contributors include Capuis and Bianchi.

See also 
 
 Adriatic Veneti
 Illyrian languages
 Indo-European languages
 Italic languages
 Italo-Celtic
 Liburnian language
 Proto-Celtic language
 Venedi
 Wave model

References

Further reading

  (archive.org)
 
 
 
  
 Prósper, Blanca Maria. "The Venetic Names of Roman Siscia". In: Voprosy onomastiki, 2018, Volume 15, Issue 3, pp. 105–124. DOI: 10.15826/vopr_onom.2018.15.3.031
 Prósper, Blanca María. "Celtic and Venetic in contact: the dialectal attribution of the personal names in the Venetic record". In: Zeitschrift für celtische Philologie 66, no. 1 (2019): 131-176. https://doi.org/10.1515/zcph-2019-0006

External links

 "Languages and Cultures of Ancient Italy. Historical Linguistics and Digital Models", Project fund by the Italian Ministry of University and Research (P.R.I.N. 2017)
 
 
 
 

Unclassified Indo-European languages
Languages of ancient Italy
Languages attested from the 5th century BC
Languages extinct in the 1st century BC
Este culture
Italo-Celtic